Sierra Menera is a  long mountain range in the southwestern end of the Iberian System.

Administratively the Sierra Menera belongs to the Sierra de Albarracín, Jiloca and Comunidad de Teruel, comarcas of Aragon, as well as to the Province of Guadalajara, Castile-La Mancha in its western side.

The Castle of Peracense rises atop an escarpment in the southern part of the range.  The place known as Mirador de la Marajosa offers ample views of the surrounding landscape. 
There are aerogenerators on some of the Sierra Menera's ridges.

Geography
The main range is aligned in a NNW - SSE direction. It is not as high or conspicuous as other mountain ranges of the Iberian System. From the hydrographic point of view the Sierra Menera divides the Atlantic from the Mediterranean watershed. The eastern rivulets are tributaries of the Jiloca River, the western of the Tagus, and the northern have no exit, ending up in the Laguna de Gallocanta basin.

Sierra Menera's highest point is the 1,601 m high summit known as Monte de San Ginés; another important peak is the 1591 m high Mojón Alto.

History
The Sierra Menera's name derives from the word for ore in Spanish language, for it has rich iron ore deposits that were exploited since ancient Celtiberian, and later also during Roman times, well until the late 20th century.

A 200 km long railway line was built by the Compañía Minera de Sierra Menera S. A. in 1903 in order to bring the iron ore to the harbor of Sagunto. This was the longest private company-owned railway line in Europe. A blast furnace facility also belonging to the company was also located in Sagunto, where a pelletizing plant and a long jetty were built in the 1970s.

The Sierra Menera range has been much scarred by environmentally unsound mining practices across the centuries. There are many tons of untreated debris and slag scattered across the range, contaminating the soil and the groundwater. Since mid 20th century, large-scale open-pit mining compounded matters, causing severe land degradation in vast mountain areas.

The Sagunto ore-processing facilities, Altos Hornos del Mediterráneo S.A., ceased their activity in 1984 and the Sierra Menera mining company went bankrupt in 1987, following which the mines and their subsidiary facilities were closed.
Massive unemployment hit the mining town of Ojos Negros after mining activity in the nearby mountains ceased. As a consequence its population went from 3000 in the 20th century to 560 in 2010.

At the time of the closure of the mines there was no official regulation forcing the mining company to repair the environmental damage caused by its activity. The Spanish Mining Law relevant at the time didn't include a provision regarding environmental impact of mining activity when it was promulgated in 1973.

See also 
 Mountains of Aragon
 Ojos Negros

References

External links

 Rama aragonesa del Sistema Ibérico
 Laguna de Almohaja
 Sagunto
Antiguas minas de Ojos Negros
 Vía Verde de Ojos Negros 

Mining in Spain
Menera
Menera
Menera
Open-pit mines
Surface mines in Spain